Safwa is a Bantu language spoken by the Safwa people of the Mbeya Region of Tanzania. Dialects are Guruka, Mbwila, Poroto, Songwe.

References

Rukwa languages
Languages of Tanzania